Morgan Island is one of the Sea Islands, located in Beaufort County, South Carolina, just north of Beaufort. It is also known as Monkey Island due to its colony of free-ranging rhesus monkeys, established in 1979.

Geography

The island is located between the Morgan and Coosaw rivers and borders the Saint Helena Sound to the south and Parrot Creek to the north. The marshland area includes three major tidal creeks as well as other small creeks. Morgan Island is uninhabited, and is home to a breeding colony of approximately 3,500 free-ranging, Indian-origin rhesus monkeys. There is a  portion of upland that supports a semi-tropical maritime forest where the monkey colony primarily resides. 

The colony on Morgan Island is one of only two rhesus monkey colonies in the continental United States, the other being on the Silver River in Florida.

Monkey colony

Historically, the island has been uninhabited due to its location and distance from the mainland. Originally, the monkey colony now located on Morgan Island was located at the Caribbean Primate Research Center in La Parguera, Puerto Rico. According to the Centers for Disease Control and Prevention (CDC), there were incidents of the free-ranging monkeys escaping, carrying viral herpes B infections, which lead to outbreaks in the local population. Puerto Rico was alarmed by this, and South Carolina stepped in to offer an uninhabited island for research. In 1979 and 1980, over 1,400 animals were relocated to Morgan Island.

The island is owned by the South Carolina Department of Natural Resources (SCDNR), and the monkeys are owned by the National Institute of Allergy and Infectious Diseases (NIAID). The monkeys are used for public health research by the National Institute of Allergy and Infectious Diseases.

Conservation 
Morgan Island lies within the ACE Basin National Estuarine Research Reserve, under the National Estuarine Research Reserve system (NERR).

References

Islands of South Carolina
Islands of Beaufort County, South Carolina
South Carolina Sea Islands
Uninhabited islands of the United States